Apensar is a "brain trainer" mobile game, available in multiple languages: English, Spanish, Portuguese, French, Italian and was developed by Icogroup in 2013 (now known as The Fastmind). The game consists of finding the common word between four images to reach the next level. The game is available for iOS and Android smart phones and tablets, the operating systems mainly used in North America, allowing the game to have a large number of users across the continent.

Apensar is also available on Facebook.

Game characteristics
The game features over 3500 levels, and the degree of difficulty varies regularly. To pass each level and receive the reward coins, the user must guess the word in common between four images. In case they cannot find the answer, the player can ask friends or family through their social media networks (Facebook, Twitter, Instagram, and WhatsApp), text messaging, email, or pay for clues with the previously gained coins having the option of buy more if needed.

The popularity generated from the game content through different social networks has led Apensar to position the game in the top 10 of free games in over 30 countries, in the top 3 in the United States, and first in Venezuela. The app currently has over 20,000,000 downloads worldwide, and each player remains active, on average, 12 minutes a day.

Communities from different countries organized independently through blogs and Facebook groups to help other people to solve the most difficult levels.

References

External links 
 

2013 video games
Android (operating system) games
IOS games
Word games
Facebook games
Casual games